Illtown is a 1998 film directed by Nick Gomez. It was the first screen appearance of Oscar Isaac.

Plot
Dante and his girlfriend Micky run a very profitable drug operation in a seaside town, aided and abetted by a host of teens who sell the smack at discos around town, as well as by Lucas, a corrupt cop who's on the take. Their downfall comes when they suspect one of the boys, Pepi, of ripping them off, and his accidental death causes disloyalty among the teens, who suspect Dante killed Pepi. All of this is perfect for the return of Gabriel, a one-time partner of Dante, who has just been released from jail, and has an almost angelic demeanor and the certainty that he can fix everyone's lives.

See also
List of films featuring the deaf and hard of hearing

References

External links

1998 crime drama films
1998 films
American crime drama films
Films about drugs
Films directed by Nick Gomez
1990s English-language films
1990s American films